Narayanan Nair Harikumar (born 19 July 1955) is a sound editor, designer and mixing engineer, known for his works in Malayalam films. He has won two National Film Awards and nine Kerala State Film Awards for audiography. He has worked for many Adoor Gopalakrishnan movies like Anantaram, Mathilukal, Nizhalkuthu, Naalu Pennungal, Oru Pennum Randaanum etc. He worked as Chief Sound Engineer and Studio Manager at Kerala State Film Development Corporation's Chithranjali Studio and later as the Chief Audio Engineer at Aries Vismayas Max.

Early life
N. Harikumar was born on 19 July 1955 in Kollam. He completed his schooling from Kollam Govt. Model Boys High School, Thumba St.Xaviers College and diploma in sound engineering from M.G.R. Government Film and Television Training Institute. He started his career as a sound recordist at Delhi Doordarshan Kendra. In 1979, he joined Chitranjali Studio as sound recordist under renowned sound engineer P. Devadas.

Awards
 National Film Awards
 1987 - Anantaram (with P. Devadas and T. Krishnanunni)
 1989 - Mathilukal

 [ 9 times [Kerala State Film Award for Best Sound Recordist|Kerala State Film Awards]]
 2000 - Mazha
 2000 - [ Mazha ]
 2002 - Nizhalkuthu
 2003 - Margam
 2004 - Perumazhakkalam
 2006 - Drishtantham
 2008 - Oru Pennum Randaanum (with T. Krishnanunni)
 2009 - Patham Nilayile Theevandi
 2013 - Kanyaka Talkies (Sound mixing)
 2014 -   Excellence in Sound mixing for different films (Sound mixing)

Other awards
 7 times- Kerala State Film Critics Award for Best Sound mixing - Oridam ect
 2011 - John Abraham National Award Special Mention for Sound mixing

 Asianet Award, Mathrubhumi Medimix award, Amritha Film Fraternity award,  Kerala State TV award for best Audio, State TV award for best Editor.

References

External links

Indian sound designers
Musicians from Kollam
Kerala State Film Award winners
Living people
1955 births
Film musicians from Kerala
M.G.R. Government Film and Television Training Institute alumni
20th-century Indian composers
21st-century Indian composers